Park Kyu-Seon (born 24 September 1981) is a South Korean football player.

He was part of the South Korea football team in 2004 Summer Olympics, who finished second in Group A, making it through to the next round, before being defeated by silver medal winners Paraguay.

Club career statistics 
As of end of 2009 season

See also
List of Koreans
South Korea national football team

External links

 National Team Player Record 
 FIFA Player Statistics

1981 births
Living people
Association football midfielders
South Korean footballers
South Korea international footballers
Ulsan Hyundai FC players
Jeonbuk Hyundai Motors players
Busan IPark players
Gimcheon Sangmu FC players
K League 1 players
Footballers at the 2004 Summer Olympics
Olympic footballers of South Korea
Footballers from Seoul
Asian Games medalists in football
Footballers at the 2002 Asian Games
Asian Games bronze medalists for South Korea
Medalists at the 2002 Asian Games